The National Institute on Retirement Security (NIRS) is a nonpartisan non-profit research institute based in Washington, D.C., United States.

NIRS seeks to "contribute to informed policy making in the area of retirement security by fostering a deep understanding of the value of traditional pension systems to employees, employers and the economy as a whole." NIRS accomplishes its agenda through a variety of research and education initiatives, such as research reports, toolkits, issue briefs, informative programming, and an Annual Policy Conference held in Washington DC each spring.

NIRS is guided by the vision that all Americans should have access to retirement security and seeks to encourage the development of public policies that enhance retirement nationwide. According to the organization's "2011 Impact Report", this vision is one of a retirement system that can meet the needs of employers, employees, and the public interest alike.

NIRS has gained recognition for its research on breaking retirement issues. As of March 2012, NIRS released thirteen reports and seven issue briefs. Their research focuses on retirement security, with an emphasis on the role and value of the defined benefit pension plan (DB) and on innovative policy and strategies in the retirement arena.

History and mission 

NIRS is a leading national research organization focused on retirement security. The organization conducts research, education and outreach programs that are national in scope.

NIRS’ mission is “to contribute to informed policymaking by fostering a deep understanding of the value of retirement security to employees, employers and the economy as a whole.”

NIRS was established in early 2007 by three leading organizations in the retirement arena:
Council of Institutional Investors (CII)
National Association of State Retirement Administrators (NASRA)
National Council on Teacher Retirement (NCTR)
In 2011, the National Conference of Public Employee Retirement Systems (NCPERS) joined the ranks of CII, NASRA, and NCTR as a leadership member of NIRS.

Since NIRS' founding, the organization has focused on its research and education endeavors. In addition to producing unbiased, non-partisan analysis, the organization has also focused on outreach, disseminating research findings to the public, policy makers, and the media. In 2009, NIRS testified before both national and state level policy makers, interviewed with a wide range national and local media outlets, and traveled the country extensively to inform stakeholders about their work. NIRS continues to be a resource to public policy makers and testified in front of the United States Senate Committee on Health, Education, Labor, and Pensions on July 12, 2011.

In August 2008, NIRSs released its first report, and has published 20 reports and issue briefs to date.

In 2009, NIRS hosted its inaugural policy conference, "Raising the Bar:Policy Solutions for Improving Retirement Security".  NIRS now holds and Annual Policy Conference annually, held every March in Washington, DC.

Leadership 

The Executive Director of NIRS is Diane Oakley. Diane Oakley joined NIRS in January 2011 and with the Board of Directors, Oakley leads the organization's strategic planning, research, and education initiatives.

Before joining NIRS, Oakley served as senior policy advisor to Congressman Earl Pomeroy, who represented the state of North Dakota.  Oakley played a key staff role in formulating legislative strategy on a range of tax, pension, Social Security, financial services, and workforce issues.  Prior to her service on Capitol Hill, Ms. Oakley held leadership positions with TIAA-CREF, a leading financial services provider.   During her 28-year tenure with the organization, she held a number of management, public policy, and technical positions.  She began as an actuary and was promoted to positions including vice president for special consulting services and vice president for associations and government relations.

Beth Almeida served as the Executive Director of NIRS from 2007 through 2010.

The Institute is guided by a nine-member Board of Directors, with representation from NIRS' leadership members.

Academic Advisory Board 

According to the NIRS website, on April 29, 2008, NIRS announced the establishment of its Academic Advisory Board. The board consists of experts in the fields of retirement policy, economics, law, and actuarial science to ensure that NIRS research continues to meet the highest standards of quality and accuracy.

As of 2010, the board included Teresa Ghilarducci, Jacob Hacker, and Alicia Munnell.

What NIRS does: research and education activities 

This section discusses NIRS' research and education endeavors that meet organization's goal of fostering a deep understanding of the value of retirement security to employees, employers, and the economy.

Research Reports and Issue Briefs 

NIRS' research focuses on informing the public policy debate around important retirement security issues at both the national and local level. By developing and disseminating high-quality and reliable research, NIRS aims to identify sensible solutions that build broad-based retirement security. NIRS has issued 20 reports and issue briefs to date.

Annual Policy Conference 

A central component of NIRS' education agenda is its Annual Policy Conference, which is generally held in Washington, D.C. in the late winter. An important goal of this non-partisan conference is to bring together thought leaders from across the retirement industry and policy spectrum—including retirement plan service providers, policymakers, plans sponsors and administrators, academics and policy experts—to pinpoint policy solutions aimed at improving American retirement prospects. The conference is thus solutions-focused as it explores the most promising public policy approaches and private-sector initiatives to enhance retirement security.

Public Pension Tool Kit 

In January 2010, NIRS released The Public Pension Resource Guide, a compilation of educational materials designed to serve as a resource and tool for interested parties. The Guide consists of three modules:

Public Pension Basics presents key facts about how pensions work—how benefits are earned, how pensions are funded, and how investment decisions are made. It also provides data on the number of Americans who rely on pensions for their retirement security.
Why Pensions Matter discusses the characteristics of pension plans that make them attractive to employees, employers, taxpayers, and the broader economy.
Strong Public Pensions for Today and Tomorrow identifies practices that can enhance the long-term sustainability of public pension plans, specifically through the integration of funding, investment, and benefit policies.

The tool kit also includes supplementary material:
Public Pension Primer
Summary Fact Sheets
Pensions by the Numbers (Key Statistics)
Glossary
PowerPoint
Frequently Asked Questions

NIRS REF

The NIRS Research and Education Fund (NIRS-REF) provides research and analysis to provide insights in achieving retirement security for all Americans. NIRS-REF is a tax-exempt, 501(c)(3) organization, supported by contributions and grants. NIRS-REF broadly disseminates its research findings to policy makers, employers and employees, so that every American can be more informed about retirement issues and better able to enjoy a secure retirement.

NIRS Members 
NIRS is able to achieve its goals in part thought the support of its member organizations, whose annual contributions help to further NIRS' ongoing research and education agenda.

NIRS' membership base represents a diverse group of organizations interested in retirement security issues such as employee benefit plans, state or local agencies that manage retirement plans, trade associations, financial services firms, and other retirement service providers. Long-standing members include the AARP/NRTA and a number of the country's largest state and local public employee pension plans.

NIRS currently offers two types of membership: Educational Sustainer and Associate. Members receive, for example, advance access to the latest retirement insights in the form of reports, member alerts, newsletters, commentary and webinars.

Media

NIRS works with the media to promote the publication of fair and balanced pieces on current retirement security issues. The NIRS website writes that the organization "is committed to working closely with the media to be a trusted source of information. In the end, this helps ensure decision makers have access to reliable information and data that results in sensible retirement policies.”

NIRS research has been referenced in a number of prominent local, national and international publications. For example,  in 2009  NIRS was cited in more than 100 news articles across the US, including publications such as The Wall Street Journal, U.S. News & World Report, USA Today, and The New York Times. Research articles and commentary authored by NIRS staff have also been published in trade journals such as 'Pensions and Investments, The Journal of Pension Benefits, and PlanSponsor''.

References

Retirement in the United States
Non-profit organizations based in Washington, D.C.
Research institutes established in 2007